Lepadidae is a family of goose barnacles, erected by Charles Darwin in 1852. There are about five genera and more than 20 described species in Lepadidae.

Genera
These genera belong to the family Lepadidae:
 Conchoderma von Olfers, 1814 (whale barnacles)
 Dosima Gray, 1825
 Hyalolepas Annandale, 1906
 Lepas Linnaeus, 1758 (goose barnacles)
 † Pristinolepas Buckeridge, 1983

References

Barnacles
Crustacean families
Taxa named by Charles Darwin